Jace Hayden Fry (born July 9, 1993) is an American professional baseball pitcher in the Detroit Tigers organization. He has played in Major League Baseball (MLB) for the Chicago White Sox. Prior to his professional career, he played college baseball for the Oregon State Beavers.

Amateur career
Growing up in Beaverton, Oregon, Fry played Little League Baseball. His team, Murrayhill Little League, represented the Northwest in the 2006 Little League World Series, where the team made it to the U.S. championship game.

Fry graduated from Southridge High School in Beaverton, and committed to enroll at Oregon State University on a college baseball scholarship. The Oakland Athletics selected Fry in the ninth round of the 2011 Major League Baseball (MLB) draft, but Oakland did not offer Fry a sufficient signing bonus to convince him to forego college. Over the summer of 2011, Fry pitched in collegiate summer baseball for the Corvallis Knights of the West Coast League (WCL). Fry injured his back in the WCL championship game, and required surgery.

In his freshman year with the Oregon State Beavers baseball team, he had a 5–3 win–loss record and a 2.45 earned run average (ERA) in 13 games started. In June 2012, he underwent Tommy John surgery after a 75% tear of the ulnar collateral ligament of the elbow. Baseball America named Fry a Second Team Freshman All-American. After recovering from surgery, Fry pitched to a 0–1 record with a 4.70 ERA in six appearances in 2013. During the 2014 season, he pitched a no-hitter on March 8 against the Northern Illinois Huskies. He finished the season with a record of 11–2 and a 1.80 ERA. He was named the Pac-12 Conference Baseball Pitcher of the Year. Collegiate Baseball named Fry a First Team All-American.

Professional career

Chicago White Sox
The Chicago White Sox selected Fry in the third round, with the 77th overall selection, of the 2014 MLB draft. He signed with the White Sox, receiving a $760,000 signing bonus, and assigned him to make his professional debut with the Great Falls Voyagers of the Rookie-level Pioneer League and spent the whole season there, posting a 1–0 record and 2.79 ERA in 9.2 innings. Fry began the 2015 season with the Winston-Salem Dash of the Class A-Advanced Carolina League. In June 2015, he underwent his second Tommy John surgery. Prior to his surgery, he was 1–8 with a 3.63 ERA in ten starts. He missed the 2016 season while rehabilitating from the surgery. The White Sox invited Fry to spring training in 2017. In 2017, he pitched for the Birmingham Barons of the Class AA Southern League where he went 2–1 with a 2.78 ERA with 52 strikeouts in 45.1 relief innings pitched.

The White Sox promoted Fry to the major leagues on September 5, 2017. In 2018, his first full season, Fry recorded a 4.38 ERA with 70 strikeouts and 20 walks in  innings. The following season, his ERA regressed to 4.75 as he walked 43 batters in 55 innings.

With the 2020 Chicago White Sox, Fry appeared in 18 games, compiling a 0–1 record with 3.66 ERA and 24 strikeouts in  innings pitched.

In January 2021, Fry underwent a microdiscectomy, likely to miss the first month of the 2021 season. On April 8, 2021, Fry was placed on the 60-day injured list. He was activated on June 26, and optioned to the Triple-A Charlotte Knights. Fry posted a 10.80 ERA in 6 appearances with Chicago in 2021. On November 5, 2021, Fry was outrighted off of the 40-man roster and elected free agency.

2022 season
On March 19, 2022, Fry signed a minor league contract with the Washington Nationals. Fry made 15 appearances for the Triple-A Rochester Red Wings, working to a 3–0 record and 3.77 ERA with 20 strikeouts in  innings pitched. He was released on June 22, 2022.

On June 29, Fry signed a minor league contract with the Philadelphia Phillies. Fry pitched in 18 games for the Triple-A Lehigh Valley IronPigs, but struggled to a 1–2 record and 6.75 ERA with 20 strikeouts in 16 innings of work. He elected free agency on November 10, 2022.

Detroit Tigers
On February 15, 2023, Fry signed a minor league contract with the Detroit Tigers organization.

References

External links

1993 births
Living people
Sportspeople from Beaverton, Oregon
Baseball players from Oregon
Southridge High School (Beaverton, Oregon) alumni
Major League Baseball pitchers
Chicago White Sox players
Oregon State Beavers baseball players
Great Falls Voyagers players
Winston-Salem Dash players
Birmingham Barons players
All-American college baseball players